

 is a Japanese international school located in City Beach within the Town of Cambridge, Western Australia in the Perth area.

The school opened in 1978. Historically the school was located on the property of a local Australian school, and the two schools had joint activities. Since 1998 the school uses the four term system used by Australian schools.

The school was previously in Scarborough. In its history, up to 2012, the school had moved three times with its final location purported to be at City Beach. However, Education Minister Peter Collier announced that the Japanese School in Perth will be relocated for the fourth time. The next location has not been disclosed.

See also

 Japanese Australian
Part-time Japanese schools in Australia
 Canberra Japanese Supplementary School
 Melbourne International School of Japanese
 Japanese Language Supplementary School of Queensland

References

Further reading

 亀畑 義彦 and 松倉 康夫. "西オ-ストラリア州・パ-ス日本人学校の教育について--海外における小規模校の教育の実践." 僻地教育研究 (44), p43-47, 1990-03. 北海道教育大学僻地教育研究施設. See profile at CiNii.

External links

 The Japanese School in Perth 
 The Japanese School in Perth  (Archive)

Asian-Australian culture in Western Australia
Schools in Perth, Western Australia
Perth
Perth
Educational institutions established in 1978
1978 establishments in Australia